= Aseana College =

College in Sabah, Malaysia

Coordinates: 5°57′48.2″N 116°03′52″E

- Established: 2008
- Affiliations: Nirvana Education Group
- Location: No. 2 Lorong 4, Sembulan Arcade, Kg. Sembulan Baru, Sembulan, Kota Kinabalu, Sabah, 88100, Malaysia
- Website: www.aseana.edu.my

Aseana College is a college in Kota Kinabalu, Sabah, Malaysia. Founded in 2008, the college provide courses on medical sciences. It is located on two campuses, with the main and administrative centre located in Sembulan, while the second campus is located kilometres away from the main campus.

== Courses ==
The college provide diploma certificates in:

- Diploma in Nursing studies
- Foundation in Science
- Certificate in English language
- Diploma in Business administration
- GCE A Level
- Diploma in Health administration
- Diploma in Occupational Safety and Health (OSHA)
